"Clap Yo Hands" is the first single released from Naughty by Nature's fourth album, Poverty's Paradise. It was released in 1995 and was written and produced by the group. "Clap Yo Hands" was not as successful as the album's next two singles, but it did make it to 5 on the Bubbling Under Hot 100 Singles (105 on the US Charts) and 33 on the Hot Rap Singles.

Music video
The music video to "Clap Yo Hands" was released in March 1995. KRS-One and Fat Joe made cameo appearances.

Track listing

A-side
"Clap Yo Hands" (Video Edit) – 4:11  
"Clap Yo Hands" (Kay Gee Funky Mix) – 4:10  
"Clap Yo Hands" (A Cappella) – 3:42

B-side
"The Chain Remains" (Clean Album Version) – 4:33  
"The Chain Remains" (Album Version) – 4:36  
"Clap Yo Hands" (Instrumental) – 4:10  
"Clap Yo Hands" (Kay Gee Funky Mix Instrumental) – 4:11

Charts

References

1995 singles
Naughty by Nature songs
Songs written by Treach
1995 songs
Tommy Boy Records singles
Song recordings produced by Naughty by Nature
Songs written by KayGee
Songs written by Vin Rock